The 2007 Edmonton municipal election was held Monday, October 15, 2007 to elect a mayor and 12 councillors to the city council, eight of the nine trustees to Edmonton Public Schools, and four of the seven trustees to the Edmonton Catholic Schools. One incumbent public school trustee had no challengers, and three separate school trustee candidates (one being an incumbent) were unchallenged. Since 1968, provincial legislation has required every municipality to hold triennial elections. Of the estimated 560,117 eligible voters, only 152,576 turned in a ballot, a voter turnout of 27.2%.

This was the last Edmonton city election to be held with multiple members elected in a contest. On July 22, 2009, City Council voted to change the electoral system of six wards electing two councillors each, to a system of 12 wards; each ward to be represented by a single councillor. The changes took effect for the 2010 election.

Candidates
Bold indicates elected, italics indicates incumbent.

Mayor

Councillors

Public school trustees

Separate school trustees
One trustee is elected from each ward, and the non-victorious candidate with the most total votes is also elected.

Jim Urlacher served as the trustee from Ward 2 until his death on May 16, 2009.

Reaction

Mayoral
Incumbent Stephen Mandel won an absolute majority of the votes for mayor, far ahead of the second candidate Don Koziak, however the lack of a close race left voter turnout very low, 27 percent. Observers saw it as an endorsement of Mandel's more ambitious attitude and free-spending ways compared to past mayors, as well as a mandate to push the province for more funding and neighbouring communities for great regional planning.

Council

Ward 4
Ben Henderson just managed to fend off Lewis Cardinal by 184 to fill the vacant seat.

Ward 5
Ward 5 provided the biggest surprise of the election as incumbent and former mayoral candidate Mike Nickel was upset by 28-year-old newcomer Don Iveson. Iveson received 2,000 more votes than Nickel. Nickel was the only incumbent not re-elected.

Ward 6
This ward was exceptionally close with just 466 votes separating first and third place.

Candidates summaries
(Italics indicate incumbent)

Mayor
Dustin Becker - heavy equipment operator
Dave Dowling - finished sixth in the 2004 mayor race
Khaled Kheireddine
Don Koziak - hotel owner
George Lam - university graduate 
Peter T. Lefaivre
Robert Ligertwood - business owner
Stephen Mandel - incumbent
Bill Whatcott - social conservative activist

Councillors

Ward 1
Betty Kennedy
Andrew Knack - retail manager
Karen Leibovici - incumbent
Linda Sloan - incumbent

Ward 2
Jabin Caouette - finished ninth in the 2004 Ward 2 race
Ron Hayter - incumbent
Kerry Hutton - finished seventh in the 2004 Ward 2 race
Kim Krushell - incumbent
Dave Loken - finished third in the 2004 Ward 2 race
Shelley Tupper - federal employee

Ward 3
Kyle Balombin - finished fifth in the 2004 Ward 3 race
Tony Caterina - finished third in the 2004 Ward 3 race 
Ed Gibbons - incumbent
Shiu Wing Mak - internet technician
Chris Martin - CBC production assistant
Chris Roehrs
Thomas James Tomilson - finished seventh in the 2004 mayor race 
Harvey Voogd - political activist

Ward 4
With the retirement of Michael Phair from Ward 4, at least one new face from Ward 4 would have a spot on Council.
Jane Batty - incumbent
Nyambura Mia Belcourt
Lewis Cardinal
Jodi Flatt
Ben Henderson - theatre director 
Sheila McKay
Brian Edward Patterson
Deborah J. Peaker
Adil Pirhabi - accountant
Hana Razga
Thomas Roberts - finished fifth in the 2004 Ward 4 race 
Margaret Saunter
Brent Thompson
Brian Wissink
Debbie Yeung - finished fourth in the 2004 Ward 4 race

Ward 5
Bryan Anderson - incumbent
Don Iveson - non-profit manager
Brent Michalyk - carpenter, president of community league
Mike Nickel - incumbent

Ward 6
With the retirement of Terry Cavanagh from Ward 6, at least one new face from Ward 6 would have a spot on Council.
Lori G. Jeffrey-Heaney - former councilor and then mayor of Val Quentin, Alberta
Chuck McKenna - transit operator, independent consultant
Chinwe Okelu - finished third in the 2004 Ward 6 race
Amarjeet Sohi - transit operator
Dave Thiele - incumbent
Tomas Dennis Vasquez - program co-ordinator

References

External links
 City of Edmonton: Edmonton Elections

2007
Edmonton